Three cities submitted bids to host the 2015 Pan American Games and Parapan games that were recognized by the Pan American Sports Organization (PASO), all three of which made the PASO Executive Committee's shortlist. The games were awarded to Toronto, Ontario, Canada on November 6, 2009. The other shortlisted cities were Lima, Peru and Bogota, Colombia. Toronto won an absolute majority of votes after just one round of voting, eliminating the need for subsequent rounds of voting. PASO delegates and the media identified a number of factors in its favor, including the size of the country, safety, experience in staging multi sporting events, government guarantees, security, and cleanliness. Moreover, the other two nations are not as developed, and with the troubles faced with the 2011 Pan American Games, Toronto was seen as the favourite. Mario Vazquez Rana, the president of the Pan American Sports Organization was also known to be favouring Toronto. Moreover, the head of Lima's bid Ricardo Mungi even admitted Toronto was the best choice as they had the facilities and budget to stage the games.

Host city selection 
While there is no formal rotation policy, the previous games would have been held in Central America/Caribbean (2003), South America (2007), and North America (2011). It was suggested that bids from Canada or the United States may have an edge. The United States did not bid so as not to interfere with its ultimately unsuccessful 2016 Olympic bid. Nevertheless, South American candidates lobbied as heavily as Canada did.

On November 6, 2009 in Guadalajara, Mexico, the candidate cities made their final presentations to the Pan American Sports Organization (PASO). After the first round of ballots, the host was announced by PASO as Toronto.

Candidate cities

Showed preliminary interest
 Mar del Plata, Argentina
The city of Mar del Plata indicated preliminary interest in bidding for the games to mark the 20th anniversary of the 1995 Pan American Games held in the city. However, at the bidding deadline the city decided against bidding for the games.

 San Jose, Costa Rica
San Jose initially indicated an interest in bidding the games, in the end San Jose decided against bidding. If San Jose was successful, it would have become the first city to stage the Pan American Games in Central America.

  Birmingham, United States
As of April 2009, Birmingham mayor Larry Langford was discussing a bid, but the deadline to apply had already passed.

  Detroit, Miami or Chicago, United States
The United States showed preliminary interest in bidding with one of three cities (Chicago, Miami or Detroit). However, the country decided to not bid for the games, because it decided to bid for the 2016 Summer Olympics with Chicago.

References

2015 Pan American Games
2015 Parapan American Games
Bids for the Pan American Games